Lake Rebecca is a lake in Dakota County, in the U.S. state of Minnesota.

Lake Rebecca was named for Rebecca Allison, the daughter of an early settler.

See also
List of lakes in Minnesota

References

Lakes of Minnesota
Lakes of Dakota County, Minnesota